The 2018 Amex-Istanbul Challenger was a professional tennis tournament played on hard courts. It was the 31st edition of the tournament which was part of the 2018 ATP Challenger Tour. It took place in Istanbul, Turkey between 10 and 16 September 2018.

Singles main-draw entrants

Seeds

 1 Rankings are as of 27 August 2018.

Other entrants
The following players received wildcards into the singles main draw: 
  Ergi Kırkın
  Nicola Kuhn
  Aleksandre Metreveli
  Anıl Yüksel

The following player received entry into the singles main draw as a special exempt:
  Enzo Couacaud

The following player received entry into the singles main draw as an alternate:
  Hugo Grenier

The following players received entry from the qualifying draw:
  Altuğ Çelikbilek
  Youssef Hossam
  Tim van Rijthoven
  Tak Khunn Wang

Champions

Singles

 Corentin Moutet def.  Quentin Halys 6–3, 6–4.

Doubles

 Rameez Junaid /  Purav Raja def.  Timur Khabibulin /  Vladyslav Manafov 7–6(7–4), 4–6, [10–7].

References

2018 ATP Challenger Tour
2018
2018 in Turkish tennis